Thiemo de Bakker and Mark Vervoort were the defending champions but chose not to defend their title.

Evan King and Denis Kudla won the title after defeating Jarryd Chaplin and Ben McLachlan 6–7(4–7), 6–4, [10–2] in the final.

Seeds

Draw

References
 Main Draw

Monterrey Challenger - Doubles